The Heckler & Koch SL7 is a roller-delayed blowback operated sporting carbine made by Heckler & Koch. It was chambered in 7.62×51mm NATO caliber and designed and marketed throughout the world as a hunting/utility rifle.

Unlike the roller-delayed blowback military Heckler & Koch rifles the cocking handle is situated far more rearward and on the right side and features a camming system to help overcome the initial friction exerted by the "bolt head locking lever" anti-bounce mechanism that prevents the bolt from bouncing off the barrel's breech surface.

The SL7 is no longer manufactured, having been replaced by the Heckler & Koch SLB 2000.

Variants
The HK 770, a hunting rifle 7.62×51mm NATO/.308 Winchester variant of the Heckler & Koch SL7, lacked the wooden handguard of the SL7 and was equipped with a longer barrel with integral flash hider/compensator slots at the end of the barrel, open rear leaf sights, and sporting-style buttstock.
The HK 940, a hunting rifle long action variant of the Heckler & Koch SL7, designed for using cartridges exceeding the 7.62×51mm NATO/.308 Winchester  overall length like the .30-06 Springfield or 7×64mm and lacked the wooden handguard of the SL7 and was equipped with a longer barrel with integral flash hider/compensator slots at the end of the barrel, open rear leaf sights, and sporting-style buttstock.
The Heckler & Koch SL6 is similar in appearance to the Heckler & Koch SL7, but is chambered for the 5.56×45mm NATO.

References

External links

 HK SL7 at Modern Firearms & Ammunition
 HK SL7
 HK SL6, HK SL7 manual (German)
 HK 630, HK 770, HK 940 Instructions for use
 H&K SL-6 and SL-7 Rifles

7.62×51mm NATO semi-automatic rifles
Roller-delayed blowback firearms
Heckler & Koch rifles